Lifou  is a commune of France in the Loyalty Islands Province of New Caledonia in the Pacific Ocean.

Geography 
Lifou is made up of Lifou Island, the largest and most heavily populated of the Loyalty Islands, its smaller neighbour Tiga Island, and several uninhabited islets in between these two. At , Lifou Island is the largest atoll in the world.

The town of Wé, on Lifou Island, is the administrative centre of the commune of Lifou as well as the provincial seat of the Loyalty Islands Province.

Climate
Lifou has a tropical monsoon climate (Köppen climate classification Am).

Geology 
Like Maré and Ouvéa, the other Loyalty islands, Lifou is made of fossil coral. Lifou is a makatea (raised coral atoll), an ancient lagoon slowly raised by geological processes. Due to the uplift, Lifou consists of a wide, flat centre surrounded by cliffs which correspond to the ancient reefal cliffs. The coral rock exhibits high porosity and hence, neither Lifou nor any of the other Loyalty Islands have surface water. It does, however, have a large freshwater reservoir which can be accessed through caves. These caves were used in the past when searching for fresh water, and are very important to the island's mythology.

History

Economic
The first Europeans to have contact with Lifouans were whalers, who had very limited, and certainly not friendly, communications with them. Sandalwood traders also came to New Caledonia around 1841.

Religious
By the mid-19th century, there were Anglican missionaries at work on Lifou, although there had been natives and Polynesian immigrants doing religious work before then.  In 1843, French Catholic missionaries arrived on Lifou; shortly afterward, the Anglicans and Catholics became involved in a religious war that lasted until the French takeover of Lifou in 1864. The missionaries even established a school on Lifou Island, and from 1840 to the early 20th century taught most of the population to read. In 1866, St. Anne Chapel was built in Inagoj. In recent years Lifouans have been referred to as "devout Christians."

Economy

Tourism
Lifou is a popular cruise port, with many cruises coming from Australia. The most common port-of-call is Easo; the ships anchor just off the island and tender passengers ashore, being too large for the wharf there.  Lifou is known for its snorkeling.

Farming
The Lifouans grow several crops, including yams, taro, and bananas; they also produce copra.

Notable residents
Christian Karembeu, a French footballer who won the 1998 FIFA World Cup with the French National side, is from Lifou.
Rosine Streeter, trade unionist, was born on Lifou.

Images of Lifou

References

External links

 Gallery of images from Lifou
 Tourism in Loyalty Islands

Communes of New Caledonia
Loyalty Islands